Statistics of Allsvenskan in season 1964.

Overview
The league was contested by 12 teams, with Djurgårdens IF winning the championship. Three top teams finished all with same points, but Djurgården was declared the champion because it had the largest goal difference.
The tournament started on 12 April and ended on 25 October.

League table

Results

Footnotes

References

External links 
http://wildstat.com/p/8401/ch/SWE_1_1964/stg/all/tour/all

Allsvenskan seasons
1
Sweden
Sweden